GN may refer to:

Businesses and organizations
 Air Gabon (IATA code: GN), an airline based in Libreville, Gabon
 Gamers Nexus, an online computer journalism organization.
 Gendarmerie Nationale (disambiguation), any of several national police forces
 Gente Nueva, a Mexican criminal organization
 GN Store Nord, a Danish manufacturer
 GN (car), a British car company operating from 1910 to 1925
 Great Northern Railway (U.S.), a railway that ran from St. Paul to Seattle
 Guardia Nacional (disambiguation), a national guard or military in some Latin American nations

Music
 G. N. (album), a 1981 album by Gianna Nannini
GN (album), a 2017 album by Ratboys

Places
 Guinea (ISO country code: GN), a nation in West Africa
 .gn, the Internet top-level domain for Guinea

Science and technology
 Graduate nurse
 Suzuki GN series, a range of motorcycles
 Giganewton, a metric unit
 Glomerulonephritis, a medical condition
 Grain (unit), a unit of mass
 Ground Network, former name of Near Earth Network
 Guide number, for an electronic camera flash

Other uses
 Gastronorm sizes, a set of food storage containers based on EN 631 standard
 Gn (digraph), a two-character combination in various languages
 Guarani language (ISO 639-1 code "gn")
 gn, abbreviation for guinea, a former British coin and currency unit
"Good night", in the slang of the cryptocurrency community
"Get naked", in urban slang
"Green nose"